Anja Jantschik (born May 28, 1969) is a German journalist and writer, mainly known for her crime novels.

Biography 
Anja Jantschik was born in Mutlangen 1969. Her father was a goldsmith in Schwäbisch Gmünd. She developed an early talent in the writer's guild. Since the mid-1990s, she has worked as a freelance journalist for several newspapers, including the Gmünder Tagespost in Ostalbkreis.

She published her first novel in 2006, a thriller with the title Mord zwischen den Zeilen. The first five Ostalb thrillers were published by Unicorn Publishing House in Schwäbisch Gmünd. As a crime writer she reads from their works regularly as part of cultural festivals and cultural events.

Anja Jantschik now lives in Göggingen.

Selected works

References

External links
 Portrait of Anja Jantschik in: Remszeitung
 Portrait of Anja Jantschik in: Schwäbische Post
 Portrait of Anja Jantschik in: Welzheimer Zeitung

1969 births
Living people
People from Mutlangen
German women novelists
German crime fiction writers
German crime writers
21st-century German novelists
German detective fiction writers
21st-century German women writers
Women crime fiction writers